Sweet and Innocent is a compilation album by British heavy metal band Diamond Head, released in 1988. It largely contains tracks off the band's 1980 debut album Lightning to the Nations, with the non-LP single "Waited Too Long", and its B-side "Play It Loud", and "Streets of Gold", which was the B-side to Diamond Head's 1980 single "Sweet and Innocent". Although all of these non-LP singles featured here later appeared on a re-released version of Diamond Head's debut by Sanctuary Records in 2001.

Track listing
 It's Electric
 The Prince
 Sweet and Innocent
 Sucking My Love
 Streets of Gold
 Play It Loud
 Shoot Out the Lights
 Waited Too Long
 Helpless

Personnel
 Brian Tatler
 Sean Harris
 Duncan Scott
 Colin Kimberley

1988 albums
Metal Masters albums
Diamond Head (band) albums